Brian Rude (August 25, 1955 –) is a Wisconsin politician and businessman.

Born in Viroqua, Wisconsin, Rude graduated from Luther College and received a MA from the University of Wisconsin-Madison . Prior to being elected to the Wisconsin State Legislature, he worked at Trane. He was elected first to the Wisconsin State Assembly in 1982 and then the Wisconsin State Senate in 1984 where he was the President of the Senate on two occasions. In 2000 he retired from the Legislature.  From 2000 to 2020 he worked at Dairyland Power as Vice President of External and Member Relations. He has served as Chair of the Greater La Crosse Chamber of Commerce, Chair of the Board of Aptiv, President of the Wisconsin Historical Society and President of the Norwegian-American Historical Association.

Notes

1955 births
Living people
People from Viroqua, Wisconsin
Presidents of the Wisconsin Senate
Members of the Wisconsin State Assembly
Luther College (Iowa) alumni